Tropical Storm Arthur was the first tropical cyclone and named storm of the annual Atlantic hurricane season that caused minimal flooding in the Carolinas in mid-June 1996. Arthur originated from an area of increased convection east of the Bahamas on June 16. Gradually, the system increased in organization, and was designated as a tropical depression on June 17. The depression tracked north-northwest and became Tropical Storm Arthur while just offshore the Southeastern United States on June 19. Later that day, Arthur peaked with maximum sustained winds of 45 mph (75 km/h), but weakened slightly before making landfall in North Carolina early the following day. After striking North Carolina, Arthur tracked out to sea and weakened further to a tropical depression. By June 21, Arthur transitioned into an extratropical cyclone. Overall, impact from Arthur was minimal, limited to light rainfall and moderate surf in North and South Carolina, as well as a tornado in Florida. Total damage amounted to $1 million (1996 USD), but no fatalities were reported.

Meteorological history

On June 16, satellite imagery revealed an area of increased convection east of the Bahamas, which was believed to have been associated with a tropical wave. On June 17, the convection increased in organization at the lower levels of the atmosphere. By 1800 UTC, the system had organized sufficiently to be designated as a tropical depression, making it the first of the season. Initially, the depression tracked north-northwest under the steering currents of the low-level flow around the western periphery of the Atlantic subtropical ridge. Strong wind shear due to fast upper-level winds associated with a cold-core low over the eastern Gulf of Mexico hindered further intensification for a time, but on June 18, an area of deep convection developed north of the center of circulation. Based on analysis of reconnaissance data, the tropical depression was upgraded to Tropical Storm Arthur at 1900 UTC on June 19.

Further strengthening occurred, as the storm attained peak winds of 45 mph (75 km/h). With time, Arthur gradually turned northeast and made landfall near Cape Lookout, North Carolina early on June 20. The center moved over the Pamlico Sound and the Cape Hatteras National Seashore and exited into the Atlantic. Although the storm contained minimal deep convection, satellite imagery indicated that Arthur had a well-defined low-level center. Deep convection increased once again on June 21, although the lack of symmetry indicated that the remnants of Arthur were losing tropical characteristics. The extratropical remnants tracked northeastward for 36 hours, and were last identified about midway between Newfoundland and the Azores, where it was absorbed by a much larger extratropical cyclone over the North Atlantic.

Preparations and impact

On June 18, a tropical storm warning was issued for coastal locations from Edisto Beach, South Carolina to Cape Lookout, North Carolina. Shortly thereafter, a tropical storm watch was issued north of Cape Lookout to the North Carolina/Virginia border, including Pamlico and Albemarle Sounds. The tropical storm watch was later extended from the North Carolina/Virginia border to Cape Charles, Virginia, including Virginia Beach. By late on June 19, all advisories were discontinued.

One tornado touched down in Florida, causing no known fatalities or injuries. In North Carolina, swells ranged as high as 7 ft (2.1 m). In addition, Arthur also brought precipitation to Georgia and Virginia, though the amounts of rainfall recorded rarely exceeded . Overall, damage caused by Arthur was minimal, totaling only $1 million (1996 USD).

See also

List of North Carolina hurricanes (1980–1999)
Other tropical cyclones named Arthur

References

External links

Tropical cyclone report

1996 Atlantic hurricane season
Atlantic tropical storms
Tropical Storm Arthur
Hurricanes in North Carolina
1996 natural disasters in the United States
June 1996 events in the United States
Arthur